The Book and the Sword is a Taiwanese television series adapted from Louis Cha's novel of the same title. The series was first broadcast on CTS in Taiwan in 1992.

Cast
 Kenny Ho as Chen Jialuo
 Leanne Liu as Huoqingtong
 Fu Chuan as Princess Fragrance
 Shen Meng-sheng as Qianlong Emperor
 Shao Hsin as Yu Yutong
 Nonnin as Li Yuanzhi
 Yeh Fei as Wen Tailai
 Niki Chin as Luo Bing
 Yang Lih as Xu Tianhong
 Han Ni as Zhou Qi
 Lung Lung as Zhang Zhaozhong
 Cheng Shao-feng as Lu Feiqing
 Chiang Yang as Zhou Zhongying
 Kuan Hong as Zhao Banshan
 Chu Chia-cheng as Taoist Wuchen
 Li Yu-lin as Zhang Jin
 Wu Shih-yang as Jiang Sigen
 Hsu Yu-yao as Shi Shuangying
 Hsieh Chun-liang as Xinyan
 Fan Hung-hsuan as Yu Wanting
 Sally Chen as Empress Dowager
 Ku Pao-ming as Li Kexiu
 Dapai as Zeng Tunan
 He Chun-cheng as Muzhuolun
 Liu Shih-fan as Huo'ayi
 Huang Chung-yu as Yan Shikui
 Hsieh Chian-wen as Chang Bozhi
 Tsai Wen-hsing as Chang Hezhi
 Wu Hui-wu as Bai Zhen
 Ting Hong-wen as Chi Yin
 Sung Tao-yi as Meng Jianxiong
 Liu Yueh-ti as Rui Dalin
 Wang Li as Granny Li
 Hong Jui-hsia as Aunt Liao

External links

Taiwanese wuxia television series
Television series set in the Qing dynasty
Works based on The Book and the Sword
1992 Taiwanese television series debuts
1992 Taiwanese television series endings
Television shows about rebels
Mandarin-language television shows
Television shows based on works by Jin Yong
Qianlong Emperor